Manuel Chang (张 孟 惠) (born 22 August 1955 in Gaza Province) is a former Mozambican economist and politician of the FRELIMO party. From 2005 to 2015 he served as the Minister of Economy and Finance in President Armando Guebuza's cabinet. He replaced Luísa Diogo as Finance Minister in February 2005.  His work as Finance Minister was intertwined in a debt scandal. In January 2015 when President Filipe Nyusi assumed office he replaced Chang as Finance Minister with Adriano Maleiane.

Debt scandal 
Three state-owned Mozambiqiue companies were created to exploit the county's marine resources; Proindicus was to perform coastal surveillance, Ematun was to engage in tuna fishing and MAM was to build and maintain shipyards. Debt problems began in 2013, when the Abu Dhabi-based shipbuilding and offshore construction company, Privinvest, obtained a $366 million contract with Proindicus, financed by IMF loans. The loans for this and other marine projects were requested by State Information and Security Service (SISE). As Finance Minister Chang confirmed to Swiss bankers that proceeds from a state loan should be paid to a commercial broker instead of to the Mozambique Central Bank. Chang guaranteed loans, that were illegal under Mozambique law, and kept these loans secret even from other cabinet members. In 2016 a default on Eurobonds issued by the Mozambican government to hide these and other unpaid loans first brought these actions to public attention.

Chang was arrested in December 2018 in South Africa for his part in diverting loan funds, based upon an indictment in the United States. His extradition to the U.S. was delayed when the government of Mozambique also filed a competing request for extradition. However, in February 2020 Mozambique withdrew its request.

References 

Mozambican economists
Finance ministers of Mozambique
FRELIMO politicians
Living people
1955 births
People from Gaza Province